Frost Hill is a mountain in the Finger Lakes Region of New York. It is located west Bristol Springs in Ontario County.

References

Mountains of Ontario County, New York
Mountains of New York (state)